Sir Charles St Leger Barter,  (1857–1931) was a career British Army officer.

Military career
Charles Barter was the son of the Rev J T Barter of Bercham, Co Cork.  A graduate of Royal Military Academy Sandhurst, he began his military career with a commission in the 105th Foot in 1875. Later attending staff college in 1883, he served in several military campaigns including the Fourth Ashanti War and the Tirah campaign.

From 1899 to 1902 he was in command of the 2nd battalion of the Yorkshire Light Infantry, serving in South Africa during the Second Boer War. The battalion served with General Bruce Hamilton in the Transvaal during the later stages of the war, and he was in command at Ermelo in March 1902. After the war had ended in June 1902, Barter resigned his command of the battalion and was placed on half-pay with a brevet promotion to colonel on 19 July 1902, leaving Cape Town for Southampton the following month. For his service, Barter was appointed a Companion of the Order of the Bath (CB) in the April 1901 South Africa Honours list (the award was dated to 29 November 1900), and he received the actual decoration after his return, from King Edward VII at Buckingham Palace on 24 October 1902.

Following his return, he was on 6 September 1902 appointed assistant adjutant-general of the Thames District, based at Chatham, Kent, with the substantive rank of colonel.

He became commander of the Poona Brigade in June 1909 and General Officer Commanding the 47th (1/2nd London) Division in August 1914 at the outset of the First World War. He led the division to France in March 1915 and by May 1915 the division was fighting at Aubers Ridge.

Major General Barter and the 47th Division continued fighting on the Western Front and participated in the Battle of the Somme in 1916.  It was during action at the Somme that the 47th Division and General Barter were involved in the battle for High Wood.  Shortly after the capture of High Wood, General Barter was relieved of his command. For the remainder of his life, Barter attempted to have an official enquiry into his dismissal but was unsuccessful.

Charles Barter was awarded the KCB (1916) and KCMG (1918) for his service and retired from the Army in 1918.

References

British Army generals of World War I
1857 births
1931 deaths
Knights Commander of the Order of the Bath
Knights Commander of the Order of St Michael and St George
Commanders of the Royal Victorian Order
British Army major generals